German inventions and discoveries are ideas, objects, processes or techniques invented, innovated or discovered, partially or entirely, in Germany or abroad by a person from Germany (that is, someone born in Germany – including to non-German parents – or born abroad with at least one German parent and who had the majority of their education or career in Germany). Often, things discovered for the first time are also called inventions and in many cases, there is no clear line between the two.

Germany has been the home of many famous inventors, discoverers and engineers, including Carl von Linde, who developed the modern refrigerator; Paul Nipkow and Karl Ferdinand Braun, who laid the foundation of the television with their Nipkow disk and cathode-ray tube (or Braun tube) respectively; Hans Geiger, the creator of the Geiger counter; and Konrad Zuse, who built the first fully automatic digital computer (Z3) and the first commercial computer (Z4). Such German inventors, engineers and industrialists as Count Ferdinand von Zeppelin, Otto Lilienthal, Gottlieb Daimler, Rudolf Diesel, Hugo Junkers and Karl Benz helped shape modern automotive and air transportation technology. Aerospace engineer Wernher von Braun developed the first space rocket at Peenemünde and later on was a prominent member of NASA and developed the Saturn V Moon rocket. Heinrich Rudolf Hertz's work in the domain of electromagnetic radiation was pivotal to the development of modern telecommunication.

Albert Einstein introduced the special relativity and general relativity theories for light and gravity in 1905 and 1915 respectively. Along with Max Planck, he was instrumental in the introduction of quantum mechanics, in which Werner Heisenberg and Max Born later made major contributions. Wilhelm Röntgen discovered X-rays. Otto Hahn was a pioneer in the fields of radiochemistry and discovered nuclear fission, while Ferdinand Cohn and Robert Koch were founders of microbiology.

The movable-type printing press was invented by German blacksmith Johannes Gutenberg in the 15th century. In 1997, Time Life magazine picked Gutenberg's invention as the most important of the second millennium. In 1998, the A&E Network ranked Gutenberg as the most influential person of the second millennium on their "Biographies of the Millennium" countdown.

The following is a list of inventions, innovations or discoveries known or generally recognised to be German.

Anatomy 

17th century: First description of duct of Wirsung by Johann Georg Wirsung
1720: Discovery of the ampulla of Vater by Abraham Vater
1745: First description of crypts of Lieberkühn by Johann Nathanael Lieberkühn
19th century: First description of Auerbach's plexus by Leopold Auerbach
19th century: First description of Meissner's plexus by Georg Meissner
19th century: Discovery of Schwann cells in the peripheral nervous system by Theodor Schwann
1836: Discovery and study of pepsin by Theodor Schwann
1840: First medical report on poliomyelitis (Heine-Medin disease), and the first to recognize the illness as a clinical entity, by Jakob Heine
1852: First description of tactile corpuscle by Georg Meissner and Rudolf Wagner
1868: Discovery of Langerhans cell by Paul Langerhans
1869: Discovery of islets of Langerhans by Paul Langerhans
1875: First description of Merkel cell by Friedrich Sigmund Merkel
1882: First successful cholecystectomy by Carl Langenbuch in Berlin
1906: Discovery of the Alzheimer's disease by Alois Alzheimer
1909: First description of Brodmann's areas by Korbinian Brodmann
1977: Plastination by Gunther von Hagens

Animals 

1907: Modern zoo (Tierpark Hagenbeck) by Carl Hagenbeck in Hamburg
1916: Guide dog; the world's first training school, established by Dr. Gerhard Stalling in Oldenburg

Archaeology 

1825: Rhamphorhynchus by Samuel Thomas von Sömmerring
1834: Plateosaurus by Johann Friedrich Engelhardt near Nuremberg, described in 1837 by Hermann von Meyer
1856: Neanderthal 1 near Düsseldorf
1856–1857: First description of the Neanderthal by Johann Carl Fuhlrott and Hermann Schaaffhausen
1860: Teratosaurus by Sixt Friedrich Jakob von Kapff near Stuttgart, described in 1861 by Hermann von Meyer
1861: Archaeopteryx by Hermann von Meyer near Solnhofen
1868–1879: Troy by Heinrich Schliemann
c. 1900: Gordium by Alfred and Gustav Körte
1906–1913: Hattusa by Hugo Winckler
1908: Homo heidelbergensis by Daniel Hartmann and Otto Schoetensack near Heidelberg
1912: The Nefertiti Bust by Ludwig Borchardt
1915: Description of Spinosaurus, the largest known theropod, by Ernst Stromer
1925: Stomatosuchus by Ernst Stromer
1931: Description of Carcharodontosaurus by Ernst Stromer
1932: Aegyptosaurus by Ernst Stromer
1934: Bahariasaurus by Ernst Stromer
1991: Ötzi by Helmut and Erika Simon from Nuremberg

Arts 

15th century: Drypoint by the Housebook Master, a south German artist
1525: Ray tracing by Albrecht Dürer
1642: Mezzotint by Ludwig von Siegen
1708: Meissen porcelain, the first European hard-paste porcelain, by Ehrenfried Walther von Tschirnhaus in Meissen
1810: Theory of Colours by Johann Wolfgang Goethe
Early 1900s: The modernist movement Expressionism
1919: Bauhaus by Walter Gropius

Astronomy 

1609–1619: Kepler's laws of planetary motion by Johannes Kepler
1781: Discovery of Uranus, with two of its major moons (Titania and Oberon), by William Herschel
1846: Discovery of Neptune by Johann Galle
1902: Discovery of the stratosphere by Richard Assmann
1909: Discovery of cosmic ray by Theodor Wulf
1916: Schwarzschild metric and Schwarzschild radius by Karl Schwarzschild

Biology, genetics and memory 

1759: Description of mesonephros by Caspar Friedrich Wolff
1790s: Recapitulation theory by Johann Friedrich Meckel and Carl Friedrich Kielmeyer
Late 1790s/early 1800s: Humboldtian science by Alexander von Humboldt
1834: Humboldt penguin by Franz Meyen, after its initial discovery by Alexander von Humboldt
1835: Cell division by Hugo von Mohl
1835: Discovery and description of mitosis by Hugo von Mohl
1839: Cell theory by Theodor Schwann and Matthias Jakob Schleiden (with contributions from Rudolf Virchow)
1840: Discovery of hemoglobin by Friedrich Ludwig Hünefeld
1845: Odic force by Carl Reichenbach
1851: Discovery of alternation of generations as a general principle in plant life by Wilhelm Hofmeister
1876: Discovery and description of meiosis by Oscar Hertwig
1877: Description of dyslexia by Adolf Kussmaul
1880s: Bacteriology by Robert Koch
Late 19th century: Isolated the non-protein component of "nuclein", determining the chemical composition of nucleic acids, and later isolated its five primary nucleobases (adenine, cytosine, guanine, thymine and uracil) by Albrecht Kossel
1885: Forgetting curve and learning curve by Hermann Ebbinghaus
1888: Description and naming of the centrosome by Theodor Boveri
1890: Description of mitochondrion by Richard Altmann
1892: Weismann barrier and germ plasm by August Weismann
1908: Hardy–Weinberg principle by Wilhelm Weinberg
1928: First reliable pregnancy test by Selmar Aschheim and Bernhard Zondek
1928: Artificial cloning of organisms by Hans Spemann and Hilde Mangold
1932: Urea cycle by Kurt Henseleit and Hans Adolf Krebs
1937: Citric acid cycle by Hans Adolf Krebs
1974: First genetically modified animal (a mouse) by Rudolf Jaenisch

Chemistry 

 

1625: Glauber's salt by Johann Rudolf Glauber
1669: Discovery of phosphorus by Hennig Brand in Hamburg
1706: Prussian blue by Heinrich Diesbach in Berlin
1724: Temperature scale Fahrenheit by Daniel Gabriel Fahrenheit
1746: Basic theory of isolating zinc by Andreas Marggraf
c. 1770 – c. 1785: Identification of molybdenum, tungsten, barium and chlorine by Carl Wilhelm Scheele
1773 or earlier: discovery of oxygen (although Joseph Priestley published his findings first) by Carl Wilhelm Scheele
1789: Discovery of the elements uranium and zirconium by Martin Heinrich Klaproth
1799: Production of sugar from sugar beets, the beginning of the modern sugar industry, by Franz Karl Achard, after foundations were laid by Andreas Marggraf
19th century: Eupione by Carl Reichenbach
1817: Discovery of cadmium by Karl Samuel Leberecht Hermann and Friedrich Stromeyer
1820s: Oechsle scale by Ferdinand Oechsle
1823: Döbereiner's lamp, often hailed as the first lighter, by Johann Wolfgang Döbereiner
1828: Discovery of creosote by Carl Reichenbach
1828, 1893: Isolation (1828) of nicotine by Wilhelm Heinrich Posselt and Karl Ludwig Reimann. The structure (1893) of nicotine was later discovered by Adolf Pinner and Richard Wolffenstein
1828: Synthesis of urea by Friedrich Wöhler (Wöhler synthesis)
1830: Creation of paraffin wax by Carl Reichenbach
1832: Discovery of pittacal by Carl Reichenbach
1834: Melamine by Justus von Liebig
1834: Discovery of phenol by Friedlieb Ferdinand Runge
1836 (or 1837): Discovery of diatomaceous earth (Kieselgur in German) by Peter Kasten on the northern slopes of the Haußelberg hill, in the Lüneburg Heath in North Germany
1838: Fuel cell by Christian Friedrich Schönbein
1839: Discovery of ozone by Christian Friedrich Schönbein
1839, 1930: Discovery of polystyrene by Eduard Simon, was made a commercial product by IG Farben in 1930
c. 1840: Nitrogen-based fertiliser by Justus von Liebig, important innovations were later made by Fritz Haber and Carl Bosch (Haber process) in the 1900s
1846: Discovery of guncotton by Christian Friedrich Schönbein
1850s: Siemens-Martin process by Carl Wilhelm Siemens
c. 1855: Bunsen burner by Robert Bunsen and Peter Desaga
1855: Chromatography by Friedlieb Ferdinand Runge
1857: Siemens cycle by Carl Wilhelm Siemens
1859: Pinacol coupling reaction by Wilhelm Rudolph Fittig
1860–61: Discovery of caesium and rubidium by Robert Bunsen and Gustav Kirchhoff
1860: Erlenmeyer flask by Emil Erlenmeyer
1863–64: Discovery of indium by Ferdinand Reich and Hieronymous Theodor Richter
1863: First synthesis of trinitrotoluene (TNT) by Julius Wilbrand
1864: First synthesis of barbiturate by Adolf von Baeyer, first marketed by Bayer under the name "Veronal" in 1903
1865: Synthetic indigo dye by Adolf von Baeyer, first marketed by BASF in 1897
c. 1870: Brix unit by Adolf Brix
1872: Synthesis of polyvinyl chloride (PVC) by Eugen Baumann
1877: Poly(methyl methacrylate) by Wilhelm Rudolph Fittig, was made a commercial product (Plexiglas) by Otto Röhm in 1933
1882: Tollens' reagent by Bernhard Tollens
1883: Claus process by Carl Friedrich Claus
1884: Paal–Knorr synthesis by Carl Paal and Ludwig Knorr
1885–1886: Discovery of germanium by Clemens Winkler
1887: Petri dish by Julius Richard Petri
1888: Büchner flask and Büchner funnel by Ernst Büchner
1895: Hampson–Linde cycle by Carl von Linde
1897: Galalith by Wilhelm Krische
1898: Polycarbonate by Alfred Einhorn, was made an commercial product by Hermann Schnell at Bayer in 1953 in Uerdingen
1898: Synthesis of polyethylene, the most common plastic, by Hans von Pechmann
1898: First synthesis of purine by Emil Fischer. He had also coined the word in 1884.
Early 20th century: Schlenk flask by Wilhelm Schlenk
1900s: Haber process by Carl Bosch and Fritz Haber
1902: Ostwald process by Wilhelm Ostwald
1903: First commercially successful decaffeination process by Ludwig Roselius (later of Café HAG), after foundations were laid by Friedlieb Ferdinand Runge in 1820
1907: Thiele tube by Johannes Thiele
1913: Coal liquefaction (Bergius process) by Friedrich Bergius
1913: Identification of protactinium by Oswald Helmuth Göhring
1925: Discovery of rhenium by Otto Berg, Ida Noddack and Walter Noddack
1928: Diels–Alder reaction by Kurt Alder and Otto Diels
1929: Discovery of adenosine triphosphate (ATP) by Karl Lohmann
1929: Creation of styrene-butadiene (synthetic rubber) by Walter Bock
1935: Karl Fischer titration by Karl Fischer
1937: Creation of polyurethane by Otto Bayer at IG Farben in Leverkusen
1953: Ziegler–Natta catalyst by Karl Ziegler
1954: Wittig reaction by Georg Wittig
1981–1996: Discovery and creation of bohrium by Peter Armbruster and Gottfried Münzenberg at the GSI Helmholtz Centre for Heavy Ion Research in Darmstadt
1982: Discovery and creation of meitnerium at the GSI Helmholtz Centre for Heavy Ion Research
1984: Discovery and creation of hassium at the GSI Helmholtz Centre for Heavy Ion Research
1994: Discovery and creation of darmstadtium at the GSI Helmholtz Centre for Heavy Ion Research
1994: Discovery and creation of roentgenium at the GSI Helmholtz Centre for Heavy Ion Research
1996: Discovery and creation of copernicium at the GSI Helmholtz Centre for Heavy Ion Research

Clothing, cosmetics and fashion 

13th century: Functional buttons with buttonholes for fastening or closing clothes
18th century or earlier: Dirndl, Lederhosen and Tracht
1709: Eau de Cologne by Johann Maria Farina (Giovanni Maria Farina) in Cologne
1871–1873: Jeans by German-born Levi Strauss (together with Russian-American Jacob Davis)
1905: Permanent wave that was suitable for use on people, by Karl Nessler
1911: Nivea, the first modern cream, by Beiersdorf AG
1960s: BB cream by Christine Schrammek

Computing 

Late 17th century: Modern binary numeral system by Gottfried Wilhelm Leibniz
1918–1923: Enigma machine by Arthur Scherbius
1920s: Hellschreiber (precursor of the impact dot matrix printers and faxes) by Rudolf Hell
1941: First programmable, fully automatic digital computer (Z3) by Konrad Zuse
1942–1945: Programming language Plankalkül, the first high-level programming language to be designed for a computer, by Konrad Zuse
1945: The world's first commercial digital computer (Z4) by Konrad Zuse
1957: Stack (abstract data type) by Klaus Samelson and Friedrich L. Bauer of Technical University Munich
1960s: Smart card by Jürgen Dethloff and Helmut Gröttrup
1990s: MP3 format by Karlheinz Brandenburg and others at the Fraunhofer Society.

Construction, architecture and shops 

1831–1834: Wire rope by Wilhelm Albert
1858: Hoffmann kiln by Friedrich Hoffmann
1880: The world's first electric elevator by Werner von Siemens
1895: Electrically driven hand drill by Carl and Wilhelm Fein in Stuttgart
1895: Exothermic welding process by Hans Goldschmidt
1926–1927: Portable electric (by Andreas Stihl in 1926 in Cannstatt) and the first petrol chainsaw (by Emil Lerp in 1927). A precursor of chainsaws was made around 1830 by Bernhard Heine (osteotome)
1927: Concrete pump by Max Giese and Fritz Hull
1930s: Particle board by Max Himmelheber
1954: Angle grinder by Ackermann + Schmitt (FLEX-Elektrowerkzeuge GmbH) in Steinheim an der Murr
1958: Modern (plastic) wall plug (Fischer Wall Plug) by Artur Fischer
1962: The world's first sex shop by Beate Uhse AG in Flensburg
1963–1967: First hydraulic breaker by Krupp in Essen
1988–1990: The concept of the Passivhaus (Passive house) standard by Wolfgang Feist in Darmstadt

Cuisine 

Altbier
Angostura bitters by Johann Gottlieb Benjamin Siegert in Venezuela, 1824
First automat restaurant (Quisisana) in Berlin, 1895
Baumkuchen
Modern beer – Reinheitsgebot and "developing the beverage [beer] to its highest perfection"
Berliner (doughnut)
Bethmännchen
Berliner Weisse
Bienenstich
Black Forest cake
Bock
Bratwurst
Braunschweiger
Currywurst by Herta Heuwer
Dominostein by Herbert Wendler
Donauwelle
Modern doner kebab sandwich in Berlin, 1972
Dortmunder Export
Fanta
Frankfurter Kranz
Frankfurter Würstchen
Gummy bear
Hamburger (the "founder" is unknown, but it has German origins)
Hamburg steak
Hedgehog slice (Kalter Hund)
Helles
Hot Dog
Jägermeister
Kölsch 
Lager
Lebkuchen
Marmite by Justus von Liebig
Märzen
Meat extract by Justus von Liebig
Obatzda
Parboiled rice (Huzenlaub Process) by Erich Huzenlaub
Pilsener by Josef Groll
Pinkel
Potato salad (Kartoffelsalat)
Pretzel (the origin is disputed, but the earliest recorded evidence of pretzels appeared in Germany)
Prinzregententorte
Pumpernickel
Radler
Riesling wine
Rye beer
Saumagen
Schwarzbier
Sprite
Strammer Max
Stollen
Streuselkuchen
Teewurst
Thuringian sausage
Toast Hawaii
Welf pudding
Wheat beer
Zwieback
Zwiebelkuchen

Education, language and printing 

12th century: Lingua Ignota, the first entirely artificial language, by St. Hildegard of Bingen, OSB
c. 1440: Printing press with movable type by Johannes Gutenberg
1605: First newspaper (Relation aller Fürnemmen und gedenckwürdigen Historien) by Johann Carolus in Strasbourg (then part of the Holy Roman Empire of the German Nation)
1774: The process of deinking by Justus Claproth
1796: Lithography by Alois Senefelder
Early 19th century: Humboldtian model of higher education by Wilhelm von Humboldt, which led to the creation of the first modern university (Universität zu Berlin) in 1810, although the University of Halle is also regarded as "the first truly modern university"
1812–1858: Grimms' Fairy Tales by Jacob and Wilhelm Grimm
1830s: Kindergarten concept by Friedrich Fröbel
1844: Wood pulp process for use in papermaking by Friedrich Gottlob Keller
1879–80: The constructed language Volapük by Johann Martin Schleyer
1884–1886: Linotype machine by Ottmar Mergenthaler
1905: The Morse code distress signal 
1919: Waldorf education by Emil Molt and Rudolf Steiner in Stuttgart
1937–1951: Interlingua by Alexander Gode

Entertainment, electronics and media 

c. 1151: The earliest known morality play (Ordo Virtutum) by St. Hildegard of Bingen, OSB
1505: The world's first (pocket) watch (Watch 1505) by Peter Henlein
1663: First magazine (Erbauliche Monaths Unterredungen)
1885: Nipkow disk (fundamental component in the earliest televisions) by Paul Gottlieb Nipkow
1897: Cathode-ray tube (CRT) and the oscilloscope by Ferdinand Braun
1903: Printed circuit board by Albert Hanson of Berlin
1907: Earplug by Max Negwer (Ohropax)
1907: Pigeon photography by Julius Neubronner
1920s: Small format camera (35mm format) by Oskar Barnack
1928: Magnetic tape in Dresden, later developed and commercialized by AEG
1930s: (Modern) tape recorder by BASF (then part of the chemical giant IG Farben) and AEG in cooperation with the state radio RRG
1934: Fernsehsender Paul Nipkow (TV Station Paul Nipkow) in Berlin, first public television station in the world
1949: Integrated circuit by Werner Jacobi (Siemens AG)
1961: Phase Alternating Line (PAL), a colour encoding system for analogue television, by Walter Bruch of Telefunken in Hanover
1970: Twisted nematic field effect by Wolfgang Helfrich (with Swiss physicist Martin Schadt)
1983: Controller Area Network (CAN bus) by Robert Bosch GmbH
1984: Short Message Service (SMS) concept by Friedhelm Hillebrand
Late 1980s and early 1990s: MP3 compression algorithm (fundamental for MP3 players) by i.a. Karlheinz Brandenburg (Fraunhofer Society)
1990: First radio-controlled wristwatch (MEGA 1) by Junghans
1991: SIM card by Giesecke & Devrient in Munich
2005: YouTube, co-founded by Jawed Karim
2011 or earlier: Li-Fi by Harald Haas

Geography, geology and mining 

1812: Mohs scale of mineral hardness by Friedrich Mohs
1855: Stauroscope by Wolfgang Franz von Kobell
1884: Köppen climate classification by Wladimir Köppen. Changes were later made by Rudolf Geiger (it is thus sometimes hailed as the "Köppen–Geiger climate classification system").
1912: Theory of continental drift and the postulation of the existence of Pangaea by Alfred Wegener
1933: Central place theory by Walter Christaller
1935: Richter magnitude scale by Beno Gutenberg (together with Charles Francis Richter)

Household and office appliance 

1835: Modern (silvered-glass) mirror by Justus von Liebig
1864: Ingrain wallpaper by Hugo Erfurt
1870–1895: Modern refrigerator and modern refrigeration by Carl von Linde.
1871: Modern mattress (the innerspring mattress) by Heinrich Westphal in Berlin
1886: Hole punch and ring binder by Friedrich Soennecken in Bonn
1886: Folding ruler by Anton Ullrich in Maikammer
1901: Adhesive tape by company Beiersdorf AG
1907: (Modern) Laundry detergent (Persil) by Henkel
1908: Paper coffee filter by Melitta Bentz
1909: Egg slicer by Willy Abel in Berlin
1929, 1949: First machine-produced tea bag (1929) and the modern tea bag (1949) by Adolf Rambold and Teekanne
1930s: Ink eraser by Pelikan
1941: Chemex Coffeemaker by Peter Schlumbohm
1954: Wigomat, the first electrical drip coffee maker
1969: Glue stick by Henkel

Mathematics 

1611: Kepler conjecture by Johannes Kepler
1623: Mechanical calculator by Wilhelm Schickard
Late 17th century: Calculus and Leibniz's notation by Gottfried Wilhelm Leibniz
1673–1676: Leibniz formula for π by Gottfried Wilhelm Leibniz
1675: Integral symbol by Gottfried Wilhelm Leibniz
1795: Least squares by Carl Friedrich Gauss
c. 1810: Gaussian elimination by Carl Friedrich Gauss
1824: Generalization of the Bessel function by Friedrich Bessel
1827: Gauss map and Gaussian curvature by Carl Friedrich Gauss
1837: Analytic number theory by Peter Gustav Lejeune Dirichlet
c. 1850: Riemann geometry by Bernhard Riemann
1859: Riemann hypothesis by Bernhard Riemann
1874: Cantor's first uncountability proof and set theory by Georg Cantor
1882: Klein bottle by Felix Klein
1891: Cantor's diagonal argument and Cantor's theorem by Georg Cantor
1897: Cantor–Bernstein–Schroeder theorem by Felix Bernstein and Ernst Schröder
c. 1900: Runge–Kutta methods by Wilhelm Kutta and Carl Runge
1900s: Hilbert space by David Hilbert
Early 20th century: Weyl tensor by Hermann Weyl

Medicine and drugs 

1796: Homeopathy by Samuel Hahnemann
1803–1827: First isolation of morphine by Friedrich Sertürner in Paderborn; first marketed to the general public by Sertürner and Company in 1817 as a pain medication; and the first commercial production began in 1827 in Darmstadt by Merck.
1832: First synthesis of chloral hydrate, the first hypnotic drug, by Justus von Liebig at the University of Giessen; Oscar Liebreich introduced the drug into medicine in 1869 and discovered its hypnotic and sedative qualities.
1840: Discovery and description of Graves-Basedow disease by Karl Adolph von Basedow
1847: Kymograph by Carl Ludwig
1850s: Microscopic pathology by Rudolf Virchow
1850–51: Ophthalmoscope by Hermann von Helmholtz
1852: First complete blood count by Karl von Vierordt
1854: Sphygmograph by Karl von Vierordt
1855: First synthesis of the cocaine alkaloid by Friedrich Gaedcke; development of an improved purification process by Albert Niemann in 1859–1860, who also coined the name "cocaine". First commercial production of cocaine began in 1862 in Darmstadt by Merck.
1881: First modern caesarean section performed by Ferdinand Adolf Kehrer (introduction of the transverse incision technique)
1882: Adhesive bandage (Guttaperchapflastermulle) by Paul Carl Beiersdorf
1882: Discovery of the Mycobacterium tuberculosis (MTB) bacteria which causes tuberculosis, by Robert Koch
1884: Discovery of the pathogenic bacterium Corynebacterium diphtheriae which causes diphtheria, by Edwin Klebs and Friedrich Löffler
1884: Koch's postulates by Robert Koch and Friedrich Loeffler, based on earlier concepts described by Jakob Henle
1884: Discovery of the vibrio cholerae bacteria which causes cholera, by Robert Koch
1887: Amphetamine by Romanian-born Lazăr Edeleanu in Berlin
1887: Löffler's medium by Friedrich Loeffler
1888: First successful afocal scleral glass contact lenses by Adolf Gaston Eugen Fick
1890: Diphtheria antitoxin by Emil von Behring
1897–1899: Aspirin by Felix Hoffmann or Arthur Eichengrün at Bayer in Elberfeld
1897: Heroin by Felix Hoffmann at Bayer in Elberfeld
1897: Protargol by Arthur Eichengrün.
1897: Discovery of the cause of foot-and-mouth disease (Aphthovirus) by Friedrich Loeffler
1907–1910: First synthesis of arsphenamine, the first antibiotic, by Paul Ehrlich and Alfred Bertheim. In 1910 marketed by Hoechst under the name Salvarsan.
1908–1911: Creation of dihydrocodeine
1909, 1929: First intrauterine device (IUD) by Richard Richter (of Waldenburg, then part of Germany; in 1909), and the first ring (Gräfenberg's ring, 1929) used by a significant number of women by Ernst Gräfenberg.
1909: Labello by Dr. Oscar Troplowitz
1912–1916: Invention of the modern condom by Poland-born Julius Fromm in Berlin
1912: MDMA by Merck chemist Anton Köllisch
1914: Development and creation of oxymorphone
1916: Creation of oxycodone by Martin Freund and Edmund Speyer at the University of Frankfurt
1920–1924: First synthesis of hydrocodone by Carl Mannich and Helene Löwenheim in 1920, first marketed by former German drug development company Knoll as Dicodid in 1924.
1922: Discovery and creation of desomorphine by Knoll
1923: Creation of hydromorphone (Dilaudid) by Knoll
1924: First human electroencephalography (EEG) recording by Hans Berger. He also invented the electroencephalogram and discovered alpha waves.
1929: Cardiac catheterization by Werner Forssmann
1932: Prontosil by Josef Klarer and Fritz Mietzsch at Bayer
1934: Synthesis of Chloroquine by Italian-born Johann "Hans" Andersag working for Bayer AG
1937–1939: Creation of methadone by Max Bockmühl and Gustav Ehrhart of IG Farben
1939: Intramedullary rod by Gerhard Küntscher
1943: Luria–Delbrück experiment by Max Delbrück
1953: Echocardiography by Carl Hellmuth Hertz (with Swedish physician Inge Edler)
1961: Combined oral contraceptive pill by Schering AG
1969: Articaine (Ultracain), a dental local anesthetic first synthesized by pharmacologist Roman Muschaweck and chemist Robert Rippel (former Hoechst AG)
1997: C-Leg by Ottobock
2007: Small incision lenticule extraction (SMILE) by Walter Sekundo and Marcus Blum
2020: mRNA-based COVID-19 vaccine (BNT162b2) based on research by Uğur Şahin and Özlem Türeci

Military and (chemical) weapons 

1498: Barrel rifling in Augsburg
1836: Dreyse needle gun by Johann Nicolaus von Dreyse
1842: Pickelhaube by King Frederick William IV of Prussia
1901: Modern flamethrower by Richard Fiedler
1916: First anti-tank grenade
1916: Stahlhelm by Dr. Friedrich Schwerd
1918: First anti-tank rifle (Mauser 1918 T-Gewehr) by Mauser
1918: First practical submachine gun (MP 18) by Theodor Bergmann
1920s: Creation of Zyklon B by Walter Heerdt and Bruno Tesch at Degesch
1935: Flecktarn by Johann Georg Otto Schick
1935–37: Jerrycan by Müller & Co in Schwelm
1936: The first ever nerve agent, tabun, by Gerhard Schrader (IG Farben) in Leverkusen
1938: The nerve agent sarin by IG Farben in Wuppertal-Elberfeld
1939: Warfare method of blitzkrieg by i.a. Heinz Guderian
1941: The only rocket-powered fighter aircraft ever to have been operational and the first piloted aircraft of any type to exceed 1000 km/h (621 mph) in level flight, the Messerschmitt Me 163, by Alexander Lippisch.
1942: First modern assault rifle (StG 44) by Hugo Schmeisser
1943: First aviation unit (Kampfgeschwader 100) to use precision-guided munition
c. 1944: First anti-tank missile (the X-7)
1944: First operational cruise missile (V-1 flying bomb) by Robert Lusser at Fieseler
1944: A modern pioneer and the world's first long-range guided ballistic missile (V-2 rocket) under the direction of Wernher von Braun
1944: The nerve agent soman by Konrad Henkel in Heidelberg

Musical instruments 

c. 1700: Clarinet by Johann Christoph Denner in Nuremberg
1805: Panharmonicon by Johann Nepomuk Mälzel
1814–1816: Metronome by Johann Nepomuk Mälzel and Dietrich Nikolaus Winkel
1818: (Modern) French horn by Heinrich Stölzel and Friedrich Blühmel
1821: Harmonica by Christian Friedrich Ludwig Buschmann
1828: Flugelhorn by Heinrich Stölzel in Berlin
1830 or earlier: Accordion in Nuremberg
1835: Tuba by Wilhelm Friedrich Wieprecht and Johann Gottfried Moritz in Berlin
1850s: Wagner tuba by Richard Wagner
1854: Bandoneon by Heinrich Band
1877: Microphone by Emile Berliner
1887: Gramophone record by Emile Berliner
1914: Hornbostel–Sachs, the most used system in musical instrument classification, by Curt Sachs (together with Erich Moritz von Hornbostel)

Physics and scientific instruments 

1512, 1576: Theodolite by Gregorius Reisch and Martin Waldseemüller (1512), although the first "true" version was created by Erasmus Habermehl (1576)
1608: Telescope by Hans Lippershey
1650: First vacuum pump by Otto von Guericke
1654: Magdeburg hemispheres by Otto von Guericke
1663: First electrostatic generator by Otto von Guericke
1745: Leyden jar (Kleistian jar) by Ewald Georg von Kleist
1777: Discovery of Lichtenberg figures by Georg Christoph Lichtenberg
1801: Discovery of ultraviolet by Johann Wilhelm Ritter
1813: Gauss's law by Carl Friedrich Gauss
1814: Discovery of Fraunhofer lines by Joseph von Fraunhofer
1817: Ackermann steering geometry by Georg Lankensperger in Munich
1817 or earlier: Gyroscope by Johann Gottlieb Friedrich von Bohnenberger in Tübingen
1820: Galvanometer by Johann Schweigger in Halle
1827: Ohm's law by Georg Ohm
1833: Magnetometer by Carl Friedrich Gauss
1845: Kirchhoff's circuit laws by Gustav Kirchhoff
1850: Formulation of the first and second law of thermodynamics by Rudolf Clausius
1852: First experimental investigation of the Magnus effect by Heinrich Gustav Magnus
1857: Geissler tube by Heinrich Geißler
1959: Helmholtz resonance by Hermann von Helmholtz
1859: Spectrometer by Robert Bunsen and Gustav Kirchhoff
1861: First telephone transmitter by Johann Philipp Reis; he also coined the term "telephone"
1864–1875: Centrifuge by brothers Alexander and Antonin Prandtl from Munich
1865: Concept of entropy by Rudolf Clausius
1869: First observation of cathode rays by Johann Wilhelm Hittorf and Julius Plücker
1870: Virial theorem by Rudolf Clausius
1874: Refractometer by Ernst Abbe
1883: First accurate electricity meter (Pendelzähler) by Hermann Aron
1886: Discovery of anode rays by Eugen Goldstein
1887: Discoveries of electromagnetic radiation, photoelectric effect and radio waves by Heinrich Hertz
1887: First parabolic antenna by Heinrich Hertz
1893–1896: Wien approximation (1896) and Wien's displacement law (1893) by Wilhelm Wien
1895: Discovery of X-rays by Wilhelm Röntgen in Würzburg
1897: Nernst lamp by Walther Nernst in Göttingen
1900: Drude model by Paul Drude
1900: Planck constant and Planck's law by Max Planck
1900–1930: Quantum mechanics by i.a. Max Planck and Werner Heisenberg
1901: Modern pyrometer by Ludwig Holborn and Ferdinand Kurlbaum
1904: Boundary layer theory by Ludwig Prandtl
1904: First radar system by Christian Hülsmeyer (Telemobiloscope)
1905: Mass–energy equivalence (E = mc2) and special relativity by Albert Einstein
1905: Rubens tube by Heinrich Rubens
1906–1912: Third law of thermodynamics (Nernst's theorem) by Walther Nernst
1913: Echo sounding by Alexander Behm
1913: Discovery of the Stark effect by Johannes Stark
1915: Noether's theorem by Emmy Noether
1916: General relativity by Albert Einstein
1917: Laser's theoretical foundation by Albert Einstein
1919: Discovery of the Barkhausen effect by Heinrich Barkhausen
1919: Betz's law by Albert Betz
1920s: (Modern) hand-held metal detector by Gerhard Fischer
1921: Discovery of nuclear isomerism by Otto Hahn
1921–22: Stern–Gerlach experiment by Otto Stern and Walther Gerlach
1924: Description of coincidence method by Walther Bothe
1924–25: Bose–Einstein statistics, Bose–Einstein condensate and Boson by Albert Einstein
1927: Free electron model by Arnold Sommerfeld
1927: Uncertainty principle by Werner Heisenberg
1928: Geiger–Müller counter by Hans Geiger and Walther Müller
1931: Electron microscope by Ernst Ruska and Max Knoll
1933: Discovery of the Meissner effect by Walther Meissner and Robert Ochsenfeld
1937–39: CNO cycle (Bethe–Weizsäcker process) by Carl von Weizsäcker and Hans Bethe
1937: Scanning electron microscope (SEM) by Manfred von Ardenne
1938: Discovery of nuclear fission by Otto Hahn and Fritz Straßmann in Berlin
1949: Development of the nuclear shell model by Maria Goeppert-Mayer and J. Hans D. Jensen
1950s: Quadrupole ion trap by Wolfgang Paul
1958: Discovery of the Mössbauer effect by Rudolf Mössbauer
1959: Penning trap by Hans Georg Dehmelt
1961: Bark scale by Eberhard Zwicker
1963: Proposition of heterojunction by Herbert Kroemer
1980: Quantum Hall effect by Klaus von Klitzing
1980s: Atomic force microscope and the scanning tunneling microscope by Gerd Binnig
1988: Discovery of giant magnetoresistance by Peter Grünberg
1994: STED microscopy by Stefan Hell and Jan Wichmann
1998: Frequency comb by Theodor W. Hänsch

Sociology, philosophy and politics 

Late 18th century: German idealism by Immanuel Kant
19th century: Marxism by Karl Marx and Friedrich Engels
1852: Credit union by Franz Hermann Schulze-Delitzsch in Saxony, later further developed by Friedrich Wilhelm Raiffeisen
Late 19th century: Verstehen by Max Weber
1879: Psychology by Wilhelm Wundt in Leipzig
1880s: The German Empire (1871–1918) became the first modern welfare state in the world under statesman Otto von Bismarck, when he e.g. innovatively implemented the following:
Health insurance (Krankenversicherung) in 1883
Accident insurance (Unfallversicherung) in 1884
Pension insurance (Gesetzliche Rentenversicherung) in 1889
1897: Scientific-Humanitarian Committee, first LGBT rights organization in history, founded by Magnus Hirschfeld in Berlin
1916: The German Empire became the first country in the world to implement daylight saving time (DST)
1930s: Critical theory by the Frankfurt School
1966: Private copying levy (also known as blank media tax or levy)
1978: Blue Angel (Der Blaue Engel) certification, the world's first ecolabel

Religion, ethics and festivities 

1434: The world's first christmas market (Striezelmarkt) in Dresden
1517: Protestantism and Lutheranism by Martin Luther
16th century: Modern Christmas tree
17th century: Easter Bunny
c. 1610: Tinsel in Nuremberg
1776: Illuminati by Adam Weishaupt
1810: Oktoberfest, the world's largest Volksfest, in Munich
1839: Advent wreath by Johann Hinrich Wichern
c. 1850: Advent calendar by German Lutherans; the modern version was created by Gerhard Lang (1881–1974) from Munich

Sport 

c. 1790: Balance beam by Johann Christoph Friedrich GutsMuths
c. 1810: Horizontal bar, parallel bars, rings and the vault apparatus by Friedrich Ludwig Jahn, who is often hailed as the "father of modern gymnastics"
1901: Modern bodybuilding by Eugen Sandow
1906: Schutzhund, a dog sport that tests a dog's tracking
c. 1910: Loop jump in figure skating by Werner Rittberger
1917–1919: Handball by Max Heiser, Karl Schelenz, and Erich Konigh in Berlin
1920: Gliding by Oskar Ursinus
1925: Wheel gymnastics by Otto Feick in Schönau an der Brend
1936: The tradition of the Olympic torch relay by Carl Diem and Alfred Schiff in Berlin
1946: Goalball by Sepp Reindle
1948: Paralympic Games by German-born Ludwig Guttmann
1954: Modern football boots with screw-in studs by Adolf (Adidas) or Rudolf Dassler (Puma)
1961: Underwater rugby by Ludwig von Bersuda in Cologne
1963: Grass skiing by Josef Kaiser
1989: International Paralympic Committee in Düsseldorf
1993: Jugger in Heidelberg
2001: Speed badminton by Bill Brandes in Berlin

Tourism and recreation 

1882: Strandkorb by Wilhelm Bartelmann in Rostock
1891: First purpose-built cruise ship (Prinzessin Victoria Luise) by Albert Ballin
Early 20th century: Pilates by Joseph Pilates
1911: Carabiner for climbing by Otto "Rambo" Herzog
1915 or earlier: Modern parachute (the first collapsible parachute) by Katharina Paulus
1920s: Autogenic training by Johannes Heinrich Schultz

Toys and games 

c. 1780: Schafkopf card game
c. 1810: Skat card game in Altenburg
1890: Plastilin by Franz Kolb
1892: Chinese checkers by Ravensburger
1902: Teddy bear (55 PB) by Richard Steiff
1907–08: Mensch ärgere Dich nicht board game by Josef Friedrich Schmidt
1964: fischertechnik by Artur Fischer
1972: First home video console (Magnavox Odyssey) by German-born Ralph H. Baer
1974: Playmobil by Hans Beck
1995: The Settlers of Catan by Klaus Teuber

Transportation 

1655: First self-propelled wheelchair by Stephan Farffler
1817: The first bicycle (dandy horse, or Laufmaschine in German) by Baron Karl von Drais
1817: Tachometer by Diedrich Uhlhorn
1834: First practical rotary electric motor by Moritz von Jacobi
1838: First electric boat by Moritz von Jacobi
1876: Otto engine by Nicolaus Otto
1879–1881: First electric locomotive and electric tramway (Gross-Lichterfelde Tramway) by Siemens & Halske
1882: Trolleybus (Electromote) by Werner von Siemens
1885: First automobile (Benz Patent-Motorwagen) by Karl Benz in Mannheim
1885, 1894: First motorcycle (Daimler Reitwagen) by Gottlieb Daimler and Wilhelm Maybach. The motorcycle of Hildebrand & Wolfmüller from 1894 (created by Heinrich and Wilhelm Hildebrand, and Alois Wolfmüller) was the first machine to be called a "motorcycle" and the world's first production motorcycle.
1885: First modern internal combustion engine by Gottlieb Daimler and Wilhelm Maybach
1886: First automobile on four wheels, by Gottlieb Daimler
1886: Motorboat by Lürssen, in commission of Gottlieb Daimler and Wilhelm Maybach, in Bremen
1888: Driver's license by Karl Benz
1888: The world's first filling station was the city pharmacy in Wiesloch
1888: Flocken Elektrowagen, regarded by some as the first real electric car, by Andreas Flocken in Coburg
1889: V engine by Gottlieb Daimler and Wilhelm Maybach
1891: Taximeter by Friedrich Wilhelm Gustav Bruhn
1893: Diesel engine, diesel fuel and biodiesel by Rudolf Diesel in Augsburg
1893: Lilienthal Normalsegelapparat, the first aeroplane to be serially produced, by Otto Lilienthal
1893: Zeppelin, the first rigid airship, by Ferdinand von Zeppelin
1895: Internal combustion engine bus by Daimler
1896: First truck (Daimler Motor-Lastwagen) by Gottlieb Daimler
1897: Flat engine by Karl Benz
1897: Internal combustion engine taxicab by Gottlieb Daimler
1901: Mercedes 35 hp, regarded by some as the first real modern automobile, by Paul Daimler and Wilhelm Maybach. The car also had the world's first drum brakes.
1902, 1934: Concept of maglev by Alfred Zehden (1902) and Hermann Kemper (1934). 
1902: First high voltage spark plug by Gottlob Honold
1902: First practical speedometer by Otto Schultze
1906: Gyrocompass by Hermann Anschütz-Kaempfe
1909, 1912: The world's first passenger airline; DELAG in Frankfurt (1909). The company also employed the first flight attendant, Heinrich Kubis (1912).
1912: The world's first diesel locomotive by Gesellschaft für Thermo-Lokomotiven Diesel-Klose-Sulzer GmbH from Munich and Borsig from Berlin
1915: The world's first all-metal aircraft (Junkers J 1) by Junkers & Co
1916: Gasoline direct injection (GDI) by Junkers & Co
1928: First rocket-powered aircraft (Lippisch Ente) by Alexander Lippisch
1935: Swept wing by Adolf Busemann
1936: The first operational and practical helicopter (Focke-Wulf Fw 61), by Focke-Achgelis
1939: First aircraft with a turbojet (Heinkel He 178), and the first practical jet aircraft, by Hans von Ohain
1943: Krueger flap by Werner Krüger
1951: Airbag by Walter Linderer
1957: Wankel engine by Felix Wankel
1960s: Defogger by Heinz Kunert
Late 1960s: Oxygen sensor by Robert Bosch GmbH
1995: Electronic stability control (ESC) by Robert Bosch GmbH and Mercedes-Benz

See also 
German inventors and discoverers
List of German chemists
List of German mathematicians
List of German physicists
List of German scientists
Science and technology in Germany

References 

Inventions And Discoveries
Lists of inventions or discoveries